50/50 is an 2019 Indian Tamil-language horror comedy film directed by Krishna Sai, who previously directed the Kannada film Traya (2019). The film stars Sethu, Shruthi Ramakrishnan, Bavithra, and Shreya Gupta. This film marks Ramakrishna's return to Tamil cinema after a sabbatical and Bavithra's lead film debut. This was Sethu's final film as actor.

Plot 
Three brothers, who are gangsters, had a tough fight with police. As the police couldn't oppose them, as they are powerful in their area, he had been searching for someone to help him take a dig at them. Meanwhile, the cop finds small time robbers and asks them to loot the gangsters. Finally, the robbers steal the money from the gangsters and enter a bungalow to escape from them. The gangsters chase them and enter the same bungalow. After getting in, they come to know it is a bhoot (haunted) bungalow. How they all come out from the bungalow, forms the rest of the story.

Cast 

 Sethu as Sethu
 Shruthi Ramakrishnan as Madhu
 Bavithra as Samantha
 Shreya Gupta as a ghost
 Bala Saravanan as Suman
 Yogi Babu as Kai Kulandhai
 John Vijay as Kulandhai
 Rajendran as Pachai Kulandhai
 Dheena as Sethu's friend
 Nandha Saravanan as Police Inspector
 Rakul  as Sethu's friend
 Sri Nikha as Andreah
 Mayilswamy as Nagaraj, a tenant
 Madhan Bob
 Kathadi Ramamurthy as the ghost's grandfather
 Pattimandram Raja as Madhu's father
 Sriranjini as Madhu's mother
 Swaminathan as Lawyer
Kavarimaan
Preethiksha
 Kothandam as Kai Kulandhai's friend

Production 
The venture began production in 2016 with Sethu and Kannada actress and Shruthi Ramakrishnan in the lead roles. Santhanam, a friend of Sethu who previously collaborated with him in Kanna Laddu Thinna Aasaiya (2013) and Vaaliba Raja (2016), denied a role in this film, because he was only signing films that featured himself in the lead role. Director Krishna Sai says the film is about three IT guys: Sethu, Bala Saravanan, and Dheena from Kalakka Povathu Yaaru?, who have lost their jobs and are involved in petty theft to have a decent life. The film was shot in Chennai and Pondicherry. Ramakrishanan played a college girl in the film. Bavithra, a model anchor, was roped in to play the role of Shruthi's younger sister. Nandha Saravanan, who is known for his role in Ghilli, plays an inspector who will use the three IT guys to take revenge on his own personal enemies, which will be played by Rajendran, John Vijay, and Yogi Babu. Swaminathan and Kothandam were cast in supporting roles.

In August 2019, the team restarted promotions and renamed the film from Aalukku Paathi 50/50 to Kadhal Modhal 50/50. The third heroine was revealed to be Mumbai-based model Shreya Gupta. Yogi Babu was promoted as the lead of the film due to his popularity, despite playing a supporting role. Upon release, the film's name was shortened to 50/50.

Soundtrack

Soundtrack was composed by Dharan Kumar. Yogi Babu was picturized in a song titled Kolamavu Kokila, the name of the film in which he starred as the main lead, became popular.

"Facebook La" - Nivas (lyrics by Krishna Sai, Chendrasekaran A)
"Usaru Bathiri" - Anthony Daasan (lyrics by  Ve. Madhan Kumar)
"Aagasam" - Shweta Mohan, Deepak (lyrics by Mani Amudhan)
"Bin Laden Ganguda" - John Vijay, Dr Narayanan (lyrics by Mani Amudhan)
"Bin Laden" (Theme) - Arunraja Kamaraj (lyrics by Mani Amudhan)
"Kolamav Kokkila" - Poovaiyar, MC D (lyrics by MC D)

Release 
The film released on 27 December 2019 with Sillu Karupatti. Maalaimalar gave the film a negative review.

References

External links 
 

2010s Tamil-language films
2019 comedy horror films
2019 films
Indian comedy horror films
Films shot in Chennai
Films scored by Dharan Kumar